Dongdan may refer to:

Dongdan, Beijing, crossing on Beijing's Chang'an Avenue and also a part of eastern central Beijing
Dongdan Kingdom, puppet state established by the Liao dynasty
Dongdan Station, interchange station on Line 1 and Line 5 of the Beijing Subway